Moisei Rafes (3 November 1883 – 1942) was a prominent Jewish politician of the Ukrainian People's Republic as the Bundist representative. After 1919 he was an official of the Bolshevik Party until the rise of Joseph Stalin, when he was imprisoned.

Rafes was a member of the 1917 Russian Constituent Assembly and also of the Central Council of Ukraine, the Petrograd Soviet, headed Jewish Bund in Kiev. In Kiev Rafes became a member of the Regional Committee in Protection of Revolution in Ukraine and served as the General Controller of the General Secretariat of Ukraine. He was succeeded at this post by another Bundist, Aleksandr Zolotarev.

When tensions within the Bund heightened, due to the pro-Bolshevik leaning of a part of the leadership, Moisei Rafes was the leader of the centrist wing of the Bund, while Mikhail Liber and Benjamin Kheifetz led the rightists.

However, Rafes led the scissionist Kombund group in Kiev in February 1919, later joined by similar groups in Yekaterinoslav, Kharkov and Poltava, but the Kombund lasted only till May 1919, when it merged into the Komfarband. These moves were apparently motivated by the large-scale pogroms committed by all the armies present in Ukraine at the time, except the Red Army. After the refusal of the Soviet authorities to authorize the formation of a distinct Jewish Communist Party, Rafes, like other former Bundists Esther Frumkin, Alexander Chemerinsky and Rakhmiel Veinshtain, finally joined the upper echelons of the Yevsektsiya, the Jewish section of the Soviet Communist party (CPSU).

Moisei Rafes was at the head of the artistic section of Sovkino and a member of the Sovkino board in the late 1920s and through 1930.

Notes

Sources

1883 births
1942 deaths
Politicians from Vilnius
People from Vilensky Uyezd
Jews from the Russian Empire
Jewish Lithuanian politicians
Jewish Ukrainian politicians
Bundists
Ukrainian people of Lithuanian-Jewish descent
Communist Party of Ukraine (Soviet Union) politicians
Jewish socialists
Members of the Central Council of Ukraine
State controllers of Ukraine
People who died in the Gulag
Jews who died in prison custody